Bernarda Morin (1832-1929) (born Venerance Morin Rouleau) was the Mother Superior and founder of the Congregation of the Sisters of Providence in Chile, an autonomous congregation of the Sisters of Providence (Montreal) Roman Catholic order founded in Canada on March 25, 1843, by Emilie Gamelin.

Life 
She was born on December 29, 1832, in Saint-Henri-de-Lévis, a rural village of Québec, Canada, and baptised Venerance Morin Rouleau. She entered the novitiate of the order of the formerly called Sisters of Charity of Providence  on May 11, 1850, in Montreal, Canada. Six months afterwards, on November 21, she took the habit. On August 22, 1852, she pronounced her permanent vows. From then, she was known as Sister Bernarda.

In October 1852, with 4 other sisters, she is designated to go to Oregon to found an establishment of Providence. Once in Oregon City, they found out that the situation was not favourable to the practice of the Community  works. They decided, as a faster way to communicate  with their Superiors in Montreal, to sail from San Francisco on March 30, 1853, in a Chilean vessel. After an agitated trip of 78 days, the "Elena" docked in Valparaiso on June 17. Practically incapable of returning to Canada because of health issues, they put themselves at the disposal of the Archbishop of Santiago, Valentín Valdivieso, who missioned them for the administration of an orphanage while expecting the approval of their Canadian Superiors.

With the permission of their Superiors, the Sisters of Providence opened a novitiate in Santiago on January 3, 1857. Mother Victoire Larroque, cofounder of the Community of Montreal, served as the Superior. When Larroque died the following month, Sister Bernarda Morin became Superior of the Mother House of Santiago. The congregation received the help of the president Manuel Montt for their support to the abandoned children. On March 12, 1880, Pope Leo XIII decreed that the Chilean province be transformed into an autonomous order, with the name of Congregation of the Sisters of Providence of Chile. The constitutions were approved by the Pope Pío X, on January 7, 1905.

On June 27, 1925, Mother Bernarda Morin received the highest decoration of the country, the Medal of the Merit, from the hands of the president Arturo Alessandri. She died the on October 4, 1929, in Santiago of Chile.  She is buried in the Mother Church of the Congregation of the Sisters of Providence in Santiago, in the  Providencia neighbourhood. It is the Church that she had built herself in 1892.

Cause Bernarda Morin-Rouleau 
In 1995, the process of her beatification and canonization Cause resumed. After finalising the diocesan process in April 2010, the Cause was studied in Rome.

Legacy 
In its 148 years of existence in Chile, the Congregation of the Sisters of Providence has founded high schools, elementary schools, homes for young children, teenage and elderly and has attended house of orphans and hospitals. The sisters also assisted the patients and prisoners. On January 24, 2011, a fire burned the Mother House, the interior of the church, the museum, the novitiate and the women home.
Mother Bernarda Morin and Mother Joseph Pariseau contributed to the expansion of the Congregation of the Sisters of Providence around the world.

The first day of June 1970, the Chilean sisters incorporated themselves back with the Congregation of Montreal. The sisters of Chile and Argentina now form the Bernarda Morin Province.

References

External links 
 http://www.iglesia.cl/especiales/testigos/  La sierva de Dios Bernarda Morin
 https://web.archive.org/web/20160125075752/http://hermanasdelaprovidencia.cl/quienes-somos/centro-bernarda-morin/

Bibliography 
 ALIAGA ROJAS, fernando, La entrega sin retorno, Santiago de Chile: Congregación Hermanas de la Providencia - Chile, 2002.

19th-century Canadian nuns
1929 deaths
Founders of Catholic religious communities
1832 births
20th-century Canadian nuns